A city-state is an independent sovereign city which serves as the center of political, economic, and cultural life over its contiguous territory. They have existed in many parts of the world since the dawn of history, including ancient poleis such as Athens, Sparta, Carthage and Rome, the atlepeme of pre-Columbian Mexico and the Italian city-states during the Middle Ages and Renaissance, such as Florence, Venice, Genoa and Milan.

With the rise of nation states worldwide, only a few modern sovereign city-states exist, with some disagreement as to which qualify; Monaco, Singapore and Vatican City are most commonly accepted as such. Singapore is the clearest example, with full self-governance, its own currency, a robust military and a population of 5.5 million.

Several non-sovereign cities enjoy a high degree of autonomy and are sometimes considered city-states. Hong Kong, Macau, and members of the United Arab Emirates—most notably Dubai and Abu Dhabi—are often cited as such.

Historical background

Ancient and medieval world 

Historical city-states included Sumerian cities such as Uruk and Ur; Ancient Egyptian city-states, such as Thebes and Memphis; the Phoenician cities (such as Tyre and Sidon); the five Philistine city-states; the Berber city-states of the Garamantes; the city-states of ancient Greece (the poleis such as Athens, Sparta, Thebes, and Corinth); the Roman Republic (which grew from a city-state into a vast empire); the Italian city-states from the Middle Ages to the early modern period, such as Florence, Siena, Ferrara, Milan (which as they grew in power began to dominate neighboring cities) and Genoa and Venice, which became powerful thalassocracies; the Mayan and other cultures of pre-Columbian Mesoamerica (including cities such as Chichen Itza, Tikal, Copán and Monte Albán); the central Asian cities along the Silk Road; the city-states of the Swahili coast; Ragusa; states of the medieval Russian lands such as Novgorod and Pskov; and many others. Danish historian Poul Holm has classed the Viking colonial cities in medieval Ireland, most importantly the Kingdom of Dublin, as city-states.

In Cyprus, the Phoenician settlement of Kition (in present-day Larnaca) was a city-state that existed from around 800 BC until the end of the 4th century BC.

Some of the most well-known examples of city-state culture in human history are the ancient Greek city-states and the merchant city-states of Renaissance Italy, which organised themselves as independent centers. The success of regional units coexisting as autonomous actors in loose geographical and cultural unity, as in Italy and Greece, often prevented their amalgamation into larger national units. However, such small political entities often survived only for short periods because they lacked the resources to defend themselves against incursions by larger states (such as Roman conquest of Greece). Thus they inevitably gave way to larger organisations of society, including the empire and the nation-state.

Central Europe

In the Holy Roman Empire (962–1806) over 80 Free Imperial Cities came to enjoy considerable autonomy in the Middle Ages and in early modern times, buttressed legally by international law following the Peace of Westphalia of 1648. Some, like three of the earlier Hanseatic cities – Bremen, Hamburg and Lübeck – pooled their economic relations with foreign powers and were able to wield considerable diplomatic clout. Individual cities often made protective alliances with other cities or with neighbouring regions, including the Hanseatic League (1358 – 17th century), the Swabian League of Cities (1331–1389), the Décapole (1354–1679) in the Alsace, or the Old Swiss Confederacy ( 1300 – 1798). The Swiss cantons of Zürich, Bern, Lucerne, Fribourg, Solothurn, Basel, Schaffhausen, and Geneva originated as city-states.

After the dissolution of the Holy Roman Empire in 1806, some cities – then members of different confederacies – officially became sovereign city-states, such as the Free Hanseatic City of Bremen (1806–11 and again 1813–71), the Free City of Frankfurt upon Main (1815–66), the Free and Hanseatic City of Hamburg (1806–11 and again 1814–71), the Free and Hanseatic City of Lübeck (1806–11 and again 1813–71), and the Free City of Kraków (1815–1846). Under Habsburg rule the city of Fiume had the status of a corpus separatum (1779–1919), which – while falling short of an independent sovereignty – had many attributes of a city-state.

Italy

In Northern and Central Italy during the medieval and Renaissance periods, city-states - with various amounts of associated land - became the standard form of polity. Some of them, despite being de facto independent states, were formally part of the Holy Roman Empire. The era of the Italian states, in particular from the 11th century to the 15th century, was characterized by the remarkable economic development, trade, manufacture, and mercantile capitalism, together with increasing urbanization，with remarkable influence throughout much of the Mediterranean world and Europe as a whole. During this time, most of the Italian city-states were ruled by one person, such as the Signoria or by a dynasty, such as the House of Gonzaga and the House of Sforza.

Examples of Italian city-states during the Middle Ages and the Renaissance: Republic of Florence, Duchy of Milan, Duchy of Ferrara,
San Marino, Duchy of Modena and Reggio, Duchy of Urbino, Duchy of Mantua and the Republic of Lucca.

Another example of Italian city-states, were the powerful maritime republics: Republic of Venice, Republic of Genoa, Republic of Amalfi, Republic of Pisa, Republic of Ancona and Duchy of Gaeta.

Southeast Asia
In the history of Mainland Southeast Asia, aristocratic groups, Buddhist leaders, and others organized settlements into autonomous or semi-autonomous city-states. These were referred to as mueang, and were usually related in a tributary relationship now described as mandala or as over-lapping sovereignty, in which smaller city-states paid tribute to larger ones that paid tribute to still larger ones—until reaching the apex in cities like Ayutthaya, Bagan, Bangkok and others that served as centers of Southeast Asian royalty. The system existed until the 19th century, when colonization by European powers occurred. Siam, a regional power at the time, needed to define their territories for negotiation with the European powers so the Siamese government established a nation-state system, incorporated their tributary cities (Lan Xang, Cambodia and some Malay cities) into their territory and abolished the mueang and the tributary system.

In early Philippine history, the barangay was a complex sociopolitical unit which scholars have historically considered the dominant organizational pattern among the various peoples of the Philippine archipelago. These sociopolitical units were sometimes also referred to as barangay states, but are more properly referred to using the technical term polity. Evidence suggests a considerable degree of independence as city states ruled by Datus, Rajahs and Sultans. Early chroniclers record that the name evolved from the term balangay, which refers to a plank boat widely used by various cultures of the Philippine archipelago prior to the arrival of European colonizers.

20th-century cities under international supervision

Danzig

The Free City of Danzig was a semi-autonomous city-state that existed between 1920 and 1939, consisting of the Baltic Sea port of Danzig (now Gdańsk, Poland) and nearly 200 towns in the surrounding areas. It was created on 15 November 1920 under the terms of Article 100 (Section XI of Part III) of the 1919 Treaty of Versailles after the end of World War I.

Fiume

After a prolonged period where the city of Fiume enjoyed considerable autonomy under Habsburg rule (see Corpus separatum (Fiume)), The Free State of Fiume was proclaimed as a fully independent free state which existed between 1920 and 1924. Its territory of 28 km2 (11 sq mi) comprised the city of Fiume (now in Croatia and, since the end of World War II, known as Rijeka) and rural areas to its north, with a corridor to its west connecting it to Italy.

Jerusalem

Under the United Nations Partition Plan for Palestine of 1947, Mandatory Palestine was to be partitioned into three states: a Jewish state of Israel, an Arab state of Palestine, and a corpus separatum (Latin for "separated body") consisting of a Jerusalem city-state under the control of United Nations Trusteeship Council. Although the plan had some international support and the UN accepted this proposal (and still officially holds the stance that Jerusalem should be held under this regime), implementation of the plan failed as the 1948 Palestine war broke out with the 1947–48 Civil War in Mandatory Palestine, ultimately resulting in Jerusalem being split into West Jerusalem and East Jerusalem. Israel would eventually gain control of East Jerusalem in the Six-Day War in 1967.

Memel

The Klaipėda Region or Memel Territory was defined by the Treaty of Versailles in 1920 when it was put under the administration of the Council of Ambassadors. The Memel Territory was to remain under the control of the League of Nations until a future day when the people of the region would be allowed to vote on whether the land would return to Germany or not. The then predominantly ethnic German Memel Territory (Prussian Lithuanians and Memellanders constituted the other ethnic groups), situated between the river and the town of that name, was occupied by Lithuania in the Klaipėda Revolt of 1923.

Shanghai

The Shanghai International Settlement (1845–1943) was an international zone with its own legal system, postal service, and currency.

Tangier

The international zone within the city of Tangier, in North Africa was approximately 373 km2 (144 sq mi). It was at first under the joint administration of France, Spain, and the United Kingdom, plus later Portugal, Italy, Belgium, the Netherlands, Sweden, and the United States. The international zone was initially attached to Morocco. It then became a French-Spanish protectorate from 1923 until 29 October 1956, when it was reintegrated into the state of Morocco.

Trieste

The Free Territory of Trieste was an independent territory situated in Central Europe between northern Italy and Yugoslavia, facing the north part of the Adriatic Sea, under direct responsibility of the United Nations Security Council in the aftermath of World War II, from 1947 to 1954. The UN attempted to make the Free Territory of Trieste into a city state, but it never gained real independence and in 1954 its territory was divided between Italy and Yugoslavia.

West Berlin 
In the 20th century West Berlin, though lacking sovereignty, functioned from 1948 until 1990 as a state legally not belonging to any other state, but ruled by the Western Allies. They allowed – notwithstanding their overlordship as occupant powers – its internal organisation as one state simultaneously being a city, officially called Berlin (West). Though West Berlin maintained close ties to the West German Federal Republic of Germany, it never legally formed a part of it.

Modern city-states

Monaco

The Principality of Monaco is an independent city-state bordering France. Monaco-Ville (the ancient fortified city) and Monaco's well-known area Monte Carlo are districts of a continuous urban zone, not distinct cities, though they were three separate municipalities (communes) until 1917. The Principality of Monaco and the city of Monaco (each having specific powers) govern the same territory. Though they maintain a small military, they would still have to rely on France for defence in the face of an aggressive power.

Singapore

Singapore is an island city-state in Southeast Asia bordering Malaysia. About 5.6 million people live and work within , making Singapore the 2nd-most-densely populated country in the world after Monaco. Singapore was part of Malaysia for two years before it was expelled from the federation in 1965, becoming an independent republic, a city and a sovereign country. The Economist refers to the nation as the "world's only fully functioning city-state". In particular, it has its own currency, a large commercial airport, one of the busiest transshipment maritime ports in the world, and fully fledged armed forces to safeguard the nation's sovereignty against potential regional aggressors.

Vatican City

Until September 1870, the city of Rome had been controlled by the pope as part of his Papal States. When King Victor Emmanuel II seized the city in 1870, Pope Pius IX refused to recognize the newly formed Kingdom of Italy.

Because he could not travel without effectively acknowledging the authority of the king, Pius IX and his successors each claimed to be a "Prisoner in the Vatican", unable to leave the  papal enclave once they had ascended the papal thrones.

The impasse was resolved in 1929 by the Lateran Treaties negotiated by the Italian dictator Benito Mussolini between King Victor Emmanuel III and Pope Pius XI. Under this treaty, the Vatican was recognized as an independent state, with the Pope as its head. The Vatican City State has its own citizenship, diplomatic corps, flag, and postage stamps. With a population of less than 1,000 (mostly clergymen), it is by far the smallest sovereign country in the world.

States with similar characteristics
A number of other small states share many of these characteristics, and are sometimes cited as modern city-states. Djibouti, Qatar, Brunei, Kuwait, Bahrain, and Malta each have a capital urban center comprising a major portion of the population and the majority of GDP. Each has more than one distinct municipality, with one identified as a capital city, though the same was often the case for historical city-states. Occasionally, microstates with high population densities such as San Marino are cited, despite lacking a large urban centre.

Non-sovereign city-states 

Some cities or urban areas, while not sovereign states, may nevertheless be constituent states of a federation, or enjoy a high degree of autonomy. As such, they function as "city-states" within the context of the sovereign state to which they belong. Historian Mogens Herman Hansen describes this aspect of self-government as: "The city-state is a self-governing, but not necessarily independent political unit." A city with more limited self-government may be referred to as an independent city.

Some non-sovereign cities which a high degree of autonomy which have been described as city-states include:

Spain: Ceuta and Melilla
 China: Hong Kong and Macau
 France: Paris
 Romania: Bucharest
 United Kingdom: Gibraltar

Some cities that are constituent states in a federation, and as such can be accurately described as non-sovereign city-states with a high degree of autonomy include:
 Argentina: Buenos Aires
 Austria: Vienna
 Belgium: Brussels
 Germany: Bremen, Berlin and Hamburg
 Mexico: Mexico City
 Russia: Moscow, Saint Petersburg, and Sevastopol (disputed)
 Switzerland: Basel-Stadt
 United Arab Emirates: Dubai, Abu Dhabi

Proposed city-states

London
The London independence movement seeks a city-state separate from the United Kingdom.

New York City
There have been various proposals for New York City to secede from the state of New York.

In the period of national crisis immediately preceding the American Civil War, Democratic Mayor Fernando Wood proposed the secession of the city as a sovereign city-state to be called the Free City of Tri-Insula (Tri-Insula meaning "three islands" in Latin), and incorporating Manhattan, Long Island and Staten Island. In an address to the city's Common Council on January 6, 1861, Mayor Wood expressed a Copperhead sympathy with the seceding states and a desire to maintain profitable cotton shipping, confidence that the city state would prosper on the import tariffs that then supplied 2/3 of federal revenue, and especially dissatisfaction with the state government at Albany. But the idea of leaving the United States proved too radical even in the turmoil of 1861 and was poorly received, especially after the Southern bombardment of Fort Sumter starting on April 12. The war, and especially conscription, was nevertheless often unpopular in the city, sparking the deadly New York Draft Riots. The neighboring City of Brooklyn, in contrast, was staunchly Unionist.

In 1969, writer Norman Mailer and columnist Jimmy Breslin ran together on an independent ticket seeking the mayoralty and City Council Presidency, challenging Mayor John Lindsay with an agenda to make New York City the 51st state. When questioned as to the name of the new state, Breslin said the city deserved to keep "New York" and that upstate should be renamed "Buffalo", after its largest city.

On 26 February 2003, a bill was introduced by Astoria, Queens Council Member Peter Vallone, Jr., and sponsored by 20 of 51 City Council members, reviving the idea of referendum for secession from New York in the context of the red state vs. blue state divide and opposition to the policies of Governor George Pataki. A committee report was written but otherwise little action was taken, and the bill was reintroduced with one additional sponsor on the same date in 2004. Like Mayor Wood, Council Member Vallone emphasized the fiscal benefits of secession, with revenue now derived not from tariffs, but from Wall Street. Council Member Vallone reintroduced the bill in 2006. In January 2008, Vallone again offered a bill for the secession of New York City from New York. After Mayor Michael Bloomberg testified to New York legislators that New York City gives the state $11 billion more than it gets back, Vallone stated: "If not secession, somebody please tell me what other options we have if the state is going to continue to take billions from us and give us back pennies? Should we raise taxes some more? Should we cut services some more? Or should we consider seriously going out on our own?" The New York City Council planned to hold a meeting on the topic.

See also
Charter city
City network
Federal district
Pyu city-states
Royal free city
List of fictional city-states in literature

References

Further reading
Mogens Herman Hansen (ed.), A comparative study of thirty city-state cultures : an investigation conducted by the Copenhagen Polis Centre, Det Kongelige Danske Videnskabernes Selskab, 2000. (Historisk-filosofiske skrifter, 21). .
Mogens Herman Hansen (ed.), A comparative study of six city-state cultures : an investigation, Det Kongelige Danske Videnskabernes Selskab, 2002. (Historisk-filosofiske skrifter, 27). .

External links

 
Types of countries
Political geography